Tucker Jones may refer to:

Anthony Tucker-Jones, military historian and intelligence expert
L. Tucker Jones, head coach for William & Mary College's men's basketball team